Piedras Negras is a city and seat of the surrounding municipality of the same name in the Mexican state of Coahuila. It stands at the northeastern edge of Coahuila on the Mexico–United States border, across the Rio Grande from Eagle Pass in the U.S. state of Texas. In the 2015 census the city had a population of 163,595 inhabitants, while the metropolitan area had a population of 245,155 inhabitants. The Piedras Negras and the Eagle Pass areas are connected by the Eagle Pass–Piedras Negras International Bridge, Camino Real International Bridge, and the Union Pacific International Railroad Bridge. 

In Spanish,  translates to 'black stones' – a reference to coal deposits in the area. Across the river, coal was formerly mined on the U.S. side at Dolchburg, near Eagle Pass. This mine closed around 1905, after a fire. These two coal-fired power plants are currently operated by Comisión Federal de Electricidad, the state-owned Mexican electric utility.

History
On June 15, 1850, a group of 34 men (commanded by Andrés Zapata, Gaspar Salazar and Antonio Ramírez) met with Colonel Juan Manuel Maldonado to give the news that they had created a pass point at Piedras Negras, to the right of the Rio Grande, south of Fort Duncan. They named it Nueva Villa de Herrera, but it later became Villa de Piedras Negras. In Otto Schober's "Breve historia de Piedras Negras," the local historian points out that the 34 men were repatriates (Mexican Americans) who arrived on June 15, 1850, in what was then called "Colonia Militar de Guerrero en Piedras Negras."

In 1855, the town was looted by a small force of 130 Texans that had been organized by Texas slaveholders for a punitive expedition against a nearby border settlement the Texans claimed were fugitive slaves and Indians. The force was led by a captain of the Texas Rangers.  As it happened, the incursion was opposed and "repelled by a superior force of Negroes, Indians, and Mexicans who were waiting in ambush" inside Mexico. But the Ranger-led expedition then looted Piedras Negras while returning to Texas.

Following the discovery of huge deposits of coal in the region, in 1881 a railroad track was begun that was completed in 1883. The regional economy flourished and on December 1, 1888, it was granted city status; this time with the name of Ciudad Porfirio Díaz. After the fall of Diaz in 1911, the city reverted to being Piedras Negras, Coahuila.

On April 26, 2004, flooding killed 31 people with up to 60 reported missing.

On April 24, 2007, an F4 tornado struck the city, killing three people there and seven in Eagle Pass, Texas.

On June 14–15, 2013 over 10,000 homes were flooded, but remarkably only caused one death.

On the night of June 8, 2018, former Piedras Negras mayor Fernando Purón was shot in the back of the head by an unknown man while Purón was taking a selfie with an admirer. Purón died on the spot, becoming the 112th candidate or politician to be killed since Mexico's electoral campaign began in September 2017. Purón was supposed to run in the 2018 Mexican election on July 1 as a congressional candidate of the Institutional Revolutionary Party (PRI). Sonia Villarreal, current mayor of Piedras Negras and fellow member of PRI, suspended her mayoral reelection campaign in response to Purón's murder to concentrate on her current duties, stating that "We don't (want) his name to be just one more added to the list of candidates who have been victims of these deplorable acts."

Geography

Demography
The Northern Region of Coahuila has approximately 300,000 inhabitants. According to the National Institute of Statistics, Geography and Data Processing (INEGI), in 2005 the population of the municipio of Piedras Negras was 143,915 inhabitants, equal to 5.77% of the population of Coahuila. 17% of the population of Piedras Negras came from other states, 3% were foreigners, and the rest were born in Coahuila. Piedras Negras has a high population growth due partly to its status as a border city fueled by U.S.-bound exports from several factories and also by persons who hope to cross the border into the United States. It is estimated that in a couple of years it will become the third most populated city of the state of Coahuila, surpassing Monclova. Nowadays Piedras Negras has more than 200,000 inhabitants.

Climate
Piedras Negras has a hot semi-arid climate, having some influences of the dry-winter humid subtropical climate (Cwa). During summer the temperatures often surpass .

The high temperatures recorded in Piedras Negras have earned it recognition as one of the hottest cities in the country.

Highest precipitation months are May, June and September with an average monthly downfall in excess of  but that is highly sporadic lending to frequent drought conditions.

Natural resources

This region generates a large amount of the national production of coal, one of the most economically important non-metallic minerals in the state.

Piedras Negras in music, television, and film
1980: “Mi Piedras Negras," Frankie y los Matadores.
1992: “Safe Side," James McMurtry.
1993: Like Water for Chocolate
2004: "Joe Mark Arizmendi "
2007: No Country for Old Men (scene in the town square were filmed in Piedras Negras)
2016: From Dusk Till Dawn season 3

Tourism

Piedras Negras' main tourist attractions are:
The Macro Plaza (Designed and Built by Cesar Dominguez, AIA, LEED AP) a large square surrounded by restaurants, shops and other businesses
The ruins of San Bernardo Mission (18th century)
The Handicrafts Museum
The Culture House
The Hunting and Fishing Club
De La Ventana Caverns
Mercado Zaragoza, known simply as El Mercado ("the Market"), a traditional Mexican market where one is able to buy a variety of hand-made arts and crafts from the state: vases, leatherworked items, clay and ceramic wares, as well as traditional Mexican candy from the region.
El Santuario de Nuestra Señora de Guadalupe, Built in 1859 of ashlar, cement and wood, this church has survived the battles of the Cristero movement in 1927 and an explosion in 1934, leading to its renovation in 1935. The construction of its current towers began in 1950.
Plaza de las Culturas (Cultures' Plaza), a new park completed in 2005. The Plaza is a homage to Mexico's three main indigenous cultures: Aztec, Mayan, and Olmec. It features a replica of a pyramid representative of the style of each of the cultures, the biggest one being a replica of the Pyramid of the Sun, located in Teotihuacan, near Mexico City. 
Estadio Piedras Negras
Estadio Sección 123
Catedral de Piedras Negras (Diócesis de Piedras Negras)
Santuario de Nuestra Señora de Guadalupe (Built in 1859 of cement and wood, this sanctuary survived the Cristeros movements in 1927 and an explosion in 1934, it was remodeled in 1935. The construction of its towers began in 1950).
Presidio militar de Monclova Viejo (1773 ruins)
Casa Redonda o Maestranza (Where constitutionalist cannons were built)
Antiguo Hotel del Ferrocarril (Ruinas)
Antigua Presidencia Municipal (Soon to be Museo de la Frontera Norte)
Plaza de las Culturas
Plaza de Toros Monumental "Arizpe"
Monumento a Venustiano Carranza (Blvd. Carranza)
Monumento al Centenario de la Independencia (Inaugurated on September 16, 1910, by President Porfirio Díaz, located between the streets of Zaragoza and Fuentes, to be later transferred to the Central Square of Colonia Roma on July 15, 1963)
Monumento a los Niños Héroes de Chapultepec (Macroplaza I)
Monumento a las víctimas de la inundación del 04/04/04 y el tornado del 24/04/07 en Villa de Fuente
Monumento al Venado Cola Blanca
Monumento '"Héroes de Coahuila"
Misión de San Bernardo (Guerrero, Coah. / 40 km de Piedras Negras)
Casa de la Cultura
Edificios de Telégrafos y Correos
Edificio de la Universidad Autónoma de Piedras Negras 
Antigua Hacienda de San Isidro
Centro de Desarrollo Comunitario Ejido Piedras Negras
Centro de Desarrollo Comunitario Col. Presidentes
Centro de Desarrollo Comunitario Col. Doctores
Centro de Desarrollo Comunitario Col. Lazaro Cárdenas
Centro Cultural Multimedia 2000
Macroplaza I
Macroplaza II
Gran Bosque Urbano – El Vergel
Teatro del IMSS (Hospital General de Zona #11)
Teatro de la Ciudad "José Manuel Maldonado Maldonado"
Auditorio de Piedras Negras
La Gran Plaza
Asta Bandera Monumental "Puente Internacional II" (50 m)
Asta Bandera Monumental " La Gran Plaza" (120 m)
Infoteca
Museo del Niño "Chapulín" (En Construcción)
Casa de las Artes
Paseo del Río

Transportation
Commercial air service is available via Aeropuerto Internacional de Piedras Negras.

International Day of the Nacho
The International Day of the Nacho takes place every October 21. It and a three-day Nacho Fest was initiated in the 1990s in the United States and Mexico to commemorate the invention of nachos by Ignacio "Nacho" Anaya in 1943 at the Victory Club restaurant in Piedras Negras.

Bike Fest
For 12 years in a row, the Annual Bike Fest has attracted visitors from 41 different cities in Mexico and the United States. Activities
last for 2–3 days and include concerts, food sales, acrobatic shows, a drive through town and a drawing with a brand new motorcycle as the grand prize. The 2016 prize was a Harley Davidson Sportster. The 2016 Bike Fest brought a revenue of Mex$1.5 million, roughly US$37,875.

Local media

Newspapers
Zócalo News 
Periódico La Voz (La Voz News)
El Día News
Revista Bravo!
El Tranchete (tabloid)

Radio
EXA FM 105.5
Di-94.5 FM Dinámica Auditiva
K93 FM (Eagle Pass, Texas)
Súper Estelar 107.9 FM 
Recuerdo 96.7
Amor 107 FM
Romántica 99.9
BACK FM 100.9 FM XHBM
Radio Gente FM 102.5 XHPNC
La Consentida 104.4 FM
Fiesta Mexicana 106.3 FM XHPSP
La Mexicana 1320 AM
La Norteñita 830 AM XEIK
Radio Popular Fronteriza S.A. 920 AM XEMJ
La Rancherita del Aire 580 AM XEMU

Local television
Televisa Piedras Negras (XHPN)
TV Azteca Piedras Negras
Super Channel 12.1/12.2
Nu9ve Piedras Negras
Visión 10 (XHPNW)
RCG Piedras Negras
Multimedios TV Piedras Negras / Eagle Pass (XHAW)
International Bridges Channel

Internet
Internet Cablecom – Internet / Cable
Infinitum by Telmex – Internet / Telephone

Internet local news
Periódico Zócalo Sitio Web
Agencia de Noticias INFONOR 
Agencia de Noticias SIP
Coahuila en Línea 
Territorio de Coahuila y Texas
ContraPunto Noticias

Recent events
On April 4, 2004, the Río Escondido (a tributary of the Río Bravo) broke its banks and some 36 residents of the Piedras Negras area were killed or vanished after the resulting flash floods.
In 2007, a tornado hit both Piedras Negras and Eagle Pass on April 24, killing three people in Piedras Negras and seven people in Eagle Pass. Several others were injured and homeless in both communities. See also Piedras Negras-Eagle Pass Tornadoes
On Monday, September 17, 2012, at least 30, and possibly more than 100, inmates broke out of a prison here, near the U.S.-Mexico border, by digging a tunnel from the prison's carpentry section.

Religious centers 
 Piedras Negras Cathedral (Diocese of Piedras Negras)
 Bishopric of Piedras Negras
 Shrine of Our Lady of Guadalupe
 Parish of Christ the King
 Parish of Our Lady of San Juan de Los Lagos
 Parish of La Sagrada Familia
 Parish of San Antonio de Padua
 Parish of the Sacred Heart of Jesus (Bravo)
 Parish of the Sacred Heart of Jesus (Villa de Fuente)
 Parish of Our Lady of Perpetual Help
 Recroria of Our Lady of Fatima
 Rectory of Our Lady of Carmen
 Rectory San Martin de Porres
 Methodist Church of Mexico "San Pablo", "Hallelujah", "King of Kings", among others
 Living Water Fountains
 Praise Center
 Anglican Church of Mexico A.R. "The Good Shepherd" and "The Resurrection
 The Church of Jesus Christ of Latter-day Saints
 Among many others...

Sports centers 

 Piedras Negras Stadium
 Stadium Section 123
 Gym "Santiago V. González"
 Municipal Gymnasium 'Beto Estrada'
 Aquatic Center of Piedras Negras
 Macroplaza II
 River Walk
 Sports Unit 'Santiago V. González'
 Sports Unit 'Guadalupe Rivas'
 Sports Unit 'MICARE'
 Sports Unit 'Víctor M. Rueda'
 Among others...

Local parties 

 Fair of the Sun (September / October)
 Bike Fest (May and June)
 Livestock Fair (June)
 International Festival of Nacho (October)
 La Polvareda (April / May): Mountain Bike Race

Economy
Piedras Negras belongs to the North economic region of Coahuila. According to [INEGI] data, the secondary and services sectors occupy almost the entire occupied population, while the primary sector occupies an almost zero percentage. The maquiladora industry employs almost 10,000 people in the municipality (about 25% of the Occupied Population), mainly engaged in the manufacture of automotive parts, electronic components and textiles.

 José López Portillo Thermoelectric Power Plant
The José López Portillo Thermoelectric Power Plant of the Federal Electricity Commission has an effective installed capacity of 1200 MW in four generating units of 300 MW each. The CTJLP is located a de Piedras Negras by the national road 57 and its infrastructure can be seen from different points of the city of piedras negras being an icon of the municipality of Nava.

This central is interconnected to the National System through 2 lines of 230 kV and 2 lines of 400 kV which are directed towards Arroyo el Coyote de Nuevo Laredo Tamaulipas and towards The Coal Frontier in Ciudad Frontera Coahuila respectively.

La Central proudly hires directly and indirectly from the region where Piedras Negras, Nava, Morelos and Allende are located, Coahuila mainly.

The main features of the plant are its coal management systems, bottom ash handling and steering wheel and its cooling system whose water is transported through an aqueduct from the Rio Bravo to its pond, traveling.

The average annual generation achieved is 9,200,000 MWH with a coal consumption of 5,300,000 t and an availability of more than 90%, thus being among the best nationally which has earned it several recognitions for its efficiency in the national system.
 'Coal Thermoelectric Power Plant II
Located in Nava, the Coal Thermoelectric Plant II is the second large-scale power plant built in Mexico to use non-coking mineral coal as a primary source of energy. It is part of the Northern Regional Production Management and delivers the generated energy to the Northeast Control Area through the 400 kV Lampazos I and II transmission lines, as well as a link to the Rio Escondido substation at the same voltage level.

The Central has four generating units with a capacity of 350,000 kW each, for a total of 1,400,000 kW. So it is currently the largest coal-fired thermoelectric plant in Latin America. annually delivers a generation of 10,300,000 MWh. Reflecting the great commitment of the staff of this Central, it is currently certified by different national and international bodies.
Another important industrial branch is automotive metal, specialized in the manufacture of parts for suspension, which has been a fundamental pillar in the economy of the region, employing more than 2,000 people.

 Hendrickson Spring Mexico
Producing docks for freight transport, this company is part of Hendrickson International within its suspensions division, in turn Company of The Boler Company.

 SANLUIS Rassini' San Luis Rassini
San Luis Rassini produces high-effort multi-sheet and parabolic springs as well as hot-rolled springs and torsion bars for the suspension of light vehicles and cars, focusing their production mostly on the U.S. market as well as the marking national auto parts.

Other important sources of employment in the region are the coal and coal 2 thermoelectric plants, Minera Carbonífera Río Escondido (MICARE) and the Coca-Cola plant (all in the municipality of Nava, conurbado with the city of Piedras Negras).
In the municipality there are 6 industrial parks, which have services of drinking water, drainage, electric power, telephone and public lighting:
 Rio Grande Industrial Park
 Piedras Negras Industrial Park
 Friendship Piedras Negras I and II Industrial Park
 Santo Domingo Industrial Park
 Airport Business Industrial Park
 Northern Industrial Park

Some incentives currently offered by the municipality for the installation of new companies are:
 Exemption from property tax for 3 years.
 Exemption in the payment of permits and licenses necessary for your operation.
 Exemption in the payment of building licenses.
 Support and management before service companies.

Workmanship
The workforce is specialized in the automotive, textile and electronics branches. Most of the workforce is owned by the Mexican Workers' CTM, CROC and SUTERM. According to the BlackStones Maquiladora Industry Salary Survey, the daily wage for a general worker as of January 2006 was $47.85 to $87.60 while for an average command it is $173.91 to $205.00.

According to statistics IMSS, the affiliated workers of the municipality have an average salary of 4'15 S.M. (Zone C, $45.81), which is relatively high compared to other cities such as Saltillo, with 4'75 S.M. or Torreón (Coahuila de Zaragoza), with 3'40 S.M. Approximately 20% of the Economically Active Population receives more than 5 S.M., while 21% receive an income of 3 to 5 S.M. The rest get less than 3 S.M.

Sister cities

Sandy, Utah, United States
Monterrey, Mexico

Notes

References

External links

Municipio de Piedras Negras Official website]
Link to tables of population data from Census of 2005 INEGI: Instituto Nacional de Estadística, Geografía e Informática
Asociacion de Agentes Aduanales de Piedras Negras

Populated places in Coahuila
Mexico–United States border crossings
Populated places established in 1850
Coahuila populated places on the Rio Grande